Isaiah ( or ; , Yəšaʿyāhū, "God is Salvation"), also known as Isaias, was the 8th-century BC Israelite prophet after whom the Book of Isaiah is named.

Within the text of the Book of Isaiah, Isaiah himself is referred to as "the prophet", but the exact relationship between the Book of Isaiah and the actual prophet Isaiah is complicated. The traditional view is that all 66 chapters of the book of Isaiah were written by one man, Isaiah, possibly in two periods between 740 BC and c. 686 BC, separated by approximately 15 years, and  that the book includes dramatic prophetic declarations of Cyrus the Great in the Bible, acting to restore the nation of Israel from Babylonian captivity. Another widely held view is that parts of the first half of the book (chapters 1–39) originated with the historical prophet, interspersed with prose commentaries written in the time of King Josiah a hundred years later, and that the remainder of the book dates from immediately before and immediately after the end of the exile in Babylon, almost two centuries after the time of the historical prophet, and perhaps these later chapters represent the work of an ongoing school of prophets who prophesied in accordance with his prophecies.

Biography

The first verse of the Book of Isaiah states that Isaiah prophesied during the reigns of Uzziah (or Azariah), Jotham, Ahaz, and Hezekiah, the kings of Judah. Uzziah's reign was 52 years in the middle of the 8th century BC, and Isaiah must have begun his ministry a few years before Uzziah's death, probably in the 740s BC. He may have been contemporary for some years with Manasseh. Thus, Isaiah may have prophesied for as long as 64 years.

According to some modern interpretations, Isaiah's wife was called "the prophetess", either because she was endowed with the prophetic gift, like Deborah and Huldah, or simply because she was the "wife of the prophet". They had two sons, naming the elder Shear-jashub, meaning "A remnant shall return", and the younger Maher-Shalal-Hash-Baz, meaning, "Quickly to spoils, plunder speedily."

Soon after this, Shalmaneser V determined to subdue the kingdom of Israel, taking over and destroying Samaria (722 BC). So long as Ahaz reigned, the kingdom of Judah was untouched by the Assyrian power. But when Hezekiah gained the throne, he was encouraged to rebel "against the king of Assyria", and entered into an alliance with the king of Egypt. The king of Assyria threatened the king of Judah, and at length invaded the land. Sennacherib (701 BC) led a powerful army into Judah. Hezekiah was reduced to despair, and submitted to the Assyrians. But after a brief interval, war broke out again. Again Sennacherib led an army into Judah, one detachment of which threatened Jerusalem Isaiah on that occasion encouraged Hezekiah to resist the Assyrians, whereupon Sennacherib sent a threatening letter to Hezekiah, which he "spread before the LORD".

According to the account in 2 Kings 19 (and its derivative account in 2 Chronicles 32) an angel of God fell on the Assyrian army and 185,000 of its men were killed in one night. "Like Xerxes in Greece, Sennacherib never recovered from the shock of the disaster in Judah. He made no more expeditions against either Southern Palestine or Egypt."

The remaining years of Hezekiah's reign were peaceful. Isaiah probably lived to its close, and possibly into the reign of Manasseh. The time and manner of his death are not specified in either the Bible or other primary sources. Later Jewish tradition says that he suffered martyrdom by being sawn in two under the orders of Manasseh.

The book of Isaiah, along with the book of Jeremiah, is distinctive in the Hebrew bible for its direct portrayal of the "wrath of the Lord" as presented, for example, in Isaiah 9:19 stating, "Through the wrath of the Lord of hosts is the land darkened, and the people shall be as the fuel of the fire."

In Christianity

The Ascension of Isaiah, a pseudepigraphical Christian text dated to sometime between the end of the 1st century and the beginning of the 3rd, gives a detailed story of Isaiah confronting an evil false prophet and ending with Isaiah being martyred – none of which is attested in the original Biblical account.

Gregory of Nyssa (c. 335–395) believed that the Prophet Isaiah "knew more perfectly than all others the mystery of the religion of the Gospel". Jerome (c. 342–420) also lauds the Prophet Isaiah, saying, "He was more of an Evangelist than a Prophet, because he described all of the Mysteries of the Church of Christ so vividly that you would assume he was not prophesying about the future, but rather was composing a history of past events." Of specific note are the songs of the Suffering Servant, which Christians say are a direct prophetic revelation of the nature, purpose, and detail of the death of Jesus Christ.

The Book of Isaiah is quoted many times by New Testament writers. The Gospel of John says that Isaiah "saw Jesus' glory and spoke about him." 

The Eastern Orthodox Church celebrates Saint Isaiah the Prophet with Saint Christopher on May 9. Isaiah is also listed on the page of saints for May 9 in the Roman martyrology of the Roman Catholic Church.

Latter Day Saint movement
The Book of Mormon quotes Jesus Christ as stating that "great are the words of Isaiah", and that all things prophesied by Isaiah have been and will be fulfilled. The Book of Mormon and Doctrine and Covenants also quote Isaiah more than any other prophet from the Old Testament. Additionally, members of the Church of Jesus Christ of Latter-day Saints consider the founding of the church by Joseph Smith in the 19th century to be a fulfillment of Isaiah 11, the translation of the Book of Mormon to be a fulfillment of Isaiah 29, and the building of Latter-day Saint temples as a fulfillment of Isaiah 2:2.

In Islam
Isaiah is not mentioned by name in the Quran or the Hadith, but appears frequently as a prophet in Islamic sources, such as Qisas Al-Anbiya and Tafsir. Tabari (310/923) provides the typical accounts for Islamic traditions regarding Isaiah. He is further mentioned and accepted as a prophet by other Islamic scholars such as Ibn Kathir, Al-Tha`labi and Kisa'i and also modern scholars such as Muhammad Asad and Abdullah Yusuf Ali. According to Muslim scholars, Isaiah prophesied the coming of Jesus and Muhammad, although the reference to Muhammad is disputed by other religious scholars. Isaiah's narrative in Islamic literature can be divided into three sections. The first establishes Isaiah as a prophet of Israel during the reign of Hezekiah; the second relates Isaiah's actions during the siege of Jerusalem by Sennacherib; and the third warns the nation of coming doom. 
Paralleling the Hebrew Bible, Islamic tradition states that Hezekiah was king in Jerusalem during Isaiah's time. Hezekiah heard and obeyed Isaiah's advice, but could not quell the turbulence in Israel. This tradition maintains that Hezekiah was a righteous man and that the turbulence worsened after him. After the death of the king, Isaiah told the people not to forsake God, and warned Israel to cease from its persistent sin and disobedience. Muslim tradition maintains that the unrighteous of Israel in their anger sought to kill Isaiah. In a death that resembles that attributed to Isaiah in Lives of the Prophets, Muslim exegesis recounts that Isaiah was martyred by Israelites by being sawn in two.

In the courts of Al-Ma'mun, the seventh Abbasid caliph, Ali al-Ridha, the great-grandson of Muhammad and prominent scholar (Imam) of his era, was questioned by the High Jewish Rabbi to prove through the Torah that both Jesus and Muhammad were prophets. Among his several proofs, the Imam references the Book of Isaiah, stating "Sha‘ya (Isaiah), the Prophet, said in the Torah concerning what you and your companions say: ‘I have seen two riders to whom (He) illuminated earth. One of them was on a donkey and the other was on a camel. Who is the rider of the donkey, and who is the rider of the camel?'" The Rabbi was unable to answer with certainty. Al-Ridha goes on to state that "As for the rider of the donkey, he is ‘Isa (Jesus); and as for the rider of the camel, he is Muhammad, may Allah bless him and his family. Do you deny that this (statement) is in the Torah?" The Rabbi responds "No, I do not deny it."

In rabbinic literature
Allusions in Jewish rabbinic literature to Isaiah contain various expansions, elaborations and inferences that go beyond what is presented in the text of the Bible itself.

Origin and calling
According to the ancient rabbis, Isaiah was a descendant of Judah and Tamar, and his father Amoz was the brother of King Amaziah.

While Isaiah, says the Midrash, was walking up and down in his study he heard God saying, "Whom shall I send?" Then Isaiah said, "Here am I; send me!" Thereupon God said to him," My children are troublesome and sensitive; if you are ready to be insulted and even beaten by them, you may accept My message; if not, you would better renounce it". Isaiah accepted the mission, and was the most forbearing, as well as the most patriotic, among the prophets, always defending Israel and imploring forgiveness for its sins. When Isaiah said, "I dwell in the midst of a people of unclean lips", he was rebuked by God for speaking in such terms of His people.

His death
It is related in the Talmud that Rabbi Simeon ben Azzai found in Jerusalem an account wherein it was written that King Manasseh killed Isaiah.  King Manasseh said to Isaiah, "Moses, your master, said, 'No man may see God and live'; but you have said, 'I saw the Lord seated upon his throne'"; and went on to point out other contradictions—as between Deuteronomy and Isaiah 40; between Exodus 33 and 2 Kings Isaiah thought: "I know that he will not accept my explanations; why should I increase his guilt?" He then uttered the tetragrammaton, a cedar-tree opened, and Isaiah disappeared within it. King Manasseh ordered the cedar to be sawn asunder, and when the saw reached his mouth Isaiah died; thus was he punished for having said, "I dwell in the midst of a people of unclean lips".

A somewhat different version of this legend is given in the Jerusalem Talmud. According to that version Isaiah, fearing King Manasseh, hid himself in a cedar-tree, but his presence was betrayed by the fringes of his garment, and King Manasseh caused the tree to be sawn in half. A passage of the Targum to Isaiah quoted by Jolowicz states that when Isaiah fled from his pursuers and took refuge in the tree, and the tree was sawn in half, the prophet's blood spurted forth. The legend of Isaiah's martyrdom spread to the Arabs and to the Christians as, for example, Athanasius the bishop of Alexandria ( 318) wrote, "Isaiah was sawn asunder".

According to rabbinic literature, Isaiah was the maternal grandfather of Manasseh of Judah.

Archaeology
In February 2018, archaeologist Eilat Mazar announced that she and her team had discovered a small seal impression which reads "[belonging] to Isaiah nvy" (could be reconstructed and read as "[belonging] to Isaiah the prophet") during the Ophel excavations, just south of the Temple Mount in Jerusalem. The tiny bulla was found "only 10 feet away" from where an intact bulla bearing the inscription "[belonging] to King Hezekiah of Judah" was discovered in 2015 by the same team. Although the name "Isaiah" in the Paleo-Hebrew alphabet is unmistakable, the damage on the bottom left part of the seal causes difficulties in confirming the word "prophet" or a name "Navi", casting some doubts whether this seal really belongs to the prophet Isaiah.

Notes

References

Further reading

 Buck, Christopher (1990). ''The Anatomy of Figuration: Maimonides’ Exegesis of Natural Convulsions in Apocalyptic Texts (Guide II.29). University of Calgary.

External links
 
 
 

7th-century BC births
7th-century BCE Jews
7th-century BC writers
8th-century BC births
8th-century BCE Hebrew people
8th-century BC writers
Angelic visionaries
Christian saints from the Old Testament
Davidic line
People whose existence is disputed